Jand Tehsil (in Urdu/Punjabi: تحصیل جنڈ ) is a tehsil of Attock District in Punjab Province of  Pakistan.

Jand City

Jand City is located in the south-west of District Attock, 100 km from Islamabad. It is a border city between KPK and Punjab. The Indus river is about 5 km from Jand City. It is surrounded by Six oftowns namely Pari, Dundi Jiswaal, Marri, Jalwaal Saghri and Kundrala.

Administration

The tehsil is administratively subdivided into 15 union councils including Jand. Names of remaining are:

See also
Goah
domel

References

Tehsils in Attock District